Neohermenias thalassitis is a moth of the family Tortricidae. It is found in Thailand and Java.

References

Moths described in 1910
Eucosmini